Isaiah Jamar Thomas (born February 7, 1989) is an American professional basketball player who last played for the Charlotte Hornets of the National Basketball Association (NBA). He most notably played with the Boston Celtics from 2015 through 2017, when he was a two-time NBA All-Star and named second-team All-NBA.

The  point guard played three years of college basketball for the Washington Huskies and was a three-time all-conference selection in the Pac-10. After electing to forgo his senior year of college, Thomas was selected by the Sacramento Kings with the final pick in the 2011 NBA draft. He spent three seasons with the Kings before joining the Phoenix Suns in 2014. Thomas was traded to Boston in February 2015. In the 2016–17 season, he led the Celtics to the first seed of the Eastern Conference and finished fifth in MVP voting.

Thomas was traded by Boston to the Cleveland Cavaliers in August 2017 before being dealt to the Los Angeles Lakers at mid-season. In July 2018, Thomas joined the Denver Nuggets. He later signed with the Washington Wizards in July 2019, before again being traded mid-season, this time to the Los Angeles Clippers where he was waived shortly after. In the midst of the 2020–21 season, Thomas signed a 10-day contract with the New Orleans Pelicans and played three games. During the 2021–22 season, Thomas joined the Lakers and Dallas Mavericks on 10-day contracts after playing one game with the Grand Rapids Gold of the NBA G League. Later in the same season, after playing two more games with the Gold, Thomas joined the Charlotte Hornets on a 10-day contract.

Early life
Born to James Thomas and Tina Baldtrip, Isaiah Thomas was named after former Detroit Pistons Hall of Fame guard Isiah Thomas. A lifelong Lakers fan, James made a bet with a friend that his beloved team would defeat the Pistons in the 1989 Finals or he would name his son after decorated Lakers nemesis Isiah Thomas. The Pistons won in a four-game sweep, but James had already warmed to the name well before then. His mother consented to it on condition that it took the Biblical spelling. He was born and raised in Tacoma, Washington. As a child, he had the nicknames "Bighead" (or Head) from his father and "Zeke" from his mother, after Isiah Thomas's nickname.

High school career
Thomas attended Curtis Senior High School in University Place, Washington, through 11th grade. As his grades had to improve to earn a scholarship, he repeated his senior year across the country at South Kent School in South Kent, Connecticut. He graduated from the Connecticut prep school in 2008. At Curtis High, playing for the varsity basketball team, Thomas had averaged 31.2 points per game as a junior. He called a news briefing on April 20, 2006, to announce his intention to sign with the University of Washington.

College career

Thomas received the blessing of Nate Robinson, the former Washington Huskies star, to wear his No. 2 jersey. In an exhibition game against Western Washington, Thomas scored 27 points on 9-of-12 field goals. He scored a season-high 27 points in an 81–67 home win over Morgan State on December 30, 2008. This surpassed his previous high of 19 points scored in a 74–51 blowout over Florida International on November 20.

Thomas averaged 15.5 points, 2.6 assists, and 3.0 rebounds per game as a true freshman. He was named Pac-10 Freshman of the Year. As a sophomore, his averages rose to 16.9 points, 3.2 assists, and 3.9 rebounds per game. He was selected first team All-Pac-10.

Thomas was again named first team All-Pac-10 in his junior year. On March 12, 2011, Thomas scored 28 points and hit a game-winning buzzer beater in overtime to lead the Huskies to victory over Arizona in the championship game of the Pac-10 tournament. He was among the final ten candidates for the Bob Cousy Award in his junior season.

On March 31, 2011, Thomas declared for the NBA draft, forgoing his final year of college eligibility.

Professional career

Sacramento Kings (2011–2014)

Before the 2011 NBA draft, Thomas participated in his own pre-draft documentary entitled "Road to the NBA–The Isaiah Thomas Story". Thomas was selected in the second round of the 2011 NBA draft with the 60th and final pick by the Sacramento Kings. On February 19, 2012, Thomas recorded his first double-double with 23 points and 11 assists against the Cleveland Cavaliers.

On March 1, 2012, Thomas was named the February Western Conference NBA Rookie of the Month after averaging 12.2 points and 4.4 assists per contest in February. No player before had gone on to win Rookie of the Month honors after being picked last in the NBA draft. On April 2, 2012, Thomas was once again named Western Conference NBA Rookie of the Month after posting averages of 13.6 points and 4.9 assists per contest in March. Thomas was also named to the NBA All-Rookie Second Team and finished seventh in NBA Rookie of the Year voting.

On January 19, 2014, Thomas scored a then-career-high of 38 points during a loss to the Oklahoma City Thunder. Five days later, he tied this same total in points against the Indiana Pacers. On March 18, 2014, he recorded his first career triple-double with 24 points, 11 assists, and 10 rebounds in a 117–111 overtime win over the Washington Wizards; giving him the distinction of being the shortest player to ever record a triple-double in the NBA.

Thomas was immensely popular in his three seasons in Sacramento; his show of solidarity and frequent appearances at City Council meetings during the Kings' relocation saga, in particular, endeared him to many fans.

Phoenix Suns (2014–2015)
On July 12, 2014, Thomas was acquired by the Phoenix Suns in a sign-and-trade deal that also sent the rights of Alex Oriakhi to the Kings. On August 14, 2014, Thomas underwent a successful arthroscopy of his left wrist, for an injury sustained the previous season. He made his debut for the Suns in their victorious 119–99 season opener against the Los Angeles Lakers, in which he recorded 23 points, 3 assists, and 1 rebound. In the Suns' next game on October 31, Thomas again recorded 23 points in a 94–89 win over the San Antonio Spurs, joining Tom Chambers, A.C. Green, and Tom Gugliotta as the fourth Sun to score at least 23 points in their first two games with the team.

After missing eight games with an ankle injury, Thomas returned to action on December 12 as he scored 10 points in the Suns' 103–105 loss to the Detroit Pistons. On January 21, 2015, he recorded a season-high 27 points off the bench in a 118–113 victory over the Portland Trail Blazers. On February 5, Thomas was announced as a contestant for the NBA Skills Challenge, making him the shortest contestant to ever participate in the event.

Boston Celtics (2015–2017)

2014–15 season
On February 19, 2015, Thomas was traded to the Boston Celtics in exchange for Marcus Thornton and a 2016 first-round pick. He made his debut for the Celtics three days later in a 118–111 overtime loss to the Los Angeles Lakers, scoring 21 points off the bench. On March 2, 2015, he was named Eastern Conference Player of the Week for games played Monday, February 23, through Sunday, March 1. He later missed eight games in March with a bruised lower back. On April 8, 2015, he scored a season-high 34 points in a 113–103 win over the Detroit Pistons. He subsequently earned Eastern Conference Player of the Week honors for games played Monday, April 6, through Sunday, April 12. In his first career playoff game on April 19, Thomas recorded 22 points and 10 assists in a first-round Game 1 loss to the Cleveland Cavaliers. The Celtics went on to lose to the Cavaliers in a four-game sweep, as Thomas averaged 17.5 points and 7.0 assists over the series. As a result of his sixth-man role with both Phoenix and Boston in 2014–15, Thomas finished second in the NBA Sixth Man of the Year Award voting with 324 points, including 33 first-place votes.

2015–16 season
On December 16, 2015, Thomas tied his then-career high of 38 points in a 119–116 loss to the Detroit Pistons. On January 28, 2016, he was named an Eastern Conference All-Star reserve for the 2016 NBA All-Star Game. Thomas became the lowest draft pick to be named an All-Star since the NBA draft was reduced to two rounds in 1989. He also became only the ninth player under  to be named an All-Star, while also tying Calvin Murphy as the shortest player to be selected for the All-Star Game. On February 8, 2016, he was named Eastern Conference Player of the Week for games played Monday, February 1, through Sunday, February 7. Thomas led the Celtics to a 4–0 week, including a road victory against the Eastern Conference-leading Cleveland Cavaliers while averaging 20.3 points (12th in the East), 7.0 assists (tied for fourth in the conference), and 4.5 rebounds. With the Celtics down 2–0 to the Atlanta Hawks in the first round of the 2016 playoffs, Thomas scored a then-career-high 42 points in Game 3 in Boston to lift the Celtics to a 111–103 win. He became only the ninth Celtic to score 40 points in a playoff game. With 28 points in Game 4, Thomas helped the Celtics even the series at 2–2 with a 104–95 overtime win. However, the Celtics went on to lose the series 4–2.

2016–17 season

Over the first 21 games of the 2016–17 season, Thomas scored 20 points or more in every contest but one. After returning from a four-game absence in early December with a groin strain, Thomas continued to put up big numbers. On December 20, he scored a then-career-high 44 points, including 36 after halftime, in a 112–109 overtime win over the Memphis Grizzlies. He also matched his career best for three-pointers, going 7-of-10 from outside the arc. He subsequently earned Eastern Conference Player of the Week honors for games played Monday, December 19 through Sunday, December 25. On December 30 against Miami, he scored 29 of his career-high 52 points in the fourth quarter, setting a franchise record for points in a period and leading Boston to a 117–114 victory over the Heat. Thomas hit six of his nine three-pointers in the fourth and broke the franchise record of 24 points in a quarter set by Larry Bird in 1983 and matched by Todd Day in 1995. Thomas's 52 points was the fourth-highest scoring total in Celtics history—Bird holds the record with 60 points in March 1985.

On January 3, 2017, Thomas recorded 29 points and a career-high 15 assists in a 115–104 win over the Utah Jazz. On January 21, he had a 41-point effort in a 127–123 overtime loss to the Portland Trail Blazers, marking his 14th 30-plus point game of the season. On January 26, he was named an Eastern Conference All-Star reserve for the 2017 NBA All-Star Game. Thomas averaged 32.9 points in January, marking the third-highest monthly average in team history—Paul Pierce averaged 33.5 in February 2006, and Larry Bird averaged 33.1 points in February 1988. On February 2, he was named Eastern Conference Player of the Month for January. He led the NBA in scoring (32.9 ppg) and tied for fifth in the East in assists (6.9 apg) for the month as the Celtics went 10–4 to take over first place in the Atlantic Division. On February 15, he scored 33 points in a 116–108 win over the Philadelphia 76ers. It was his 40th straight 20-point game, tying the team record set by John Havlicek during the 1971–72 season. The following day, he had 29 points in a 104–103 loss to the Chicago Bulls, going 8 for 18 from the field in his 41st straight game with at least 20 points, breaking Havlicek's team record. With 19 points against the Atlanta Hawks on February 27, Thomas's franchise-record streak of consecutive 20-point games ended at 43. It was only the second time this season he did not register at least 20 points in a game. On March 12 against Chicago, Thomas hit his 200th three-point shot of the season, becoming the third Celtics player all-time to reach that mark along with Antoine Walker and Paul Pierce. With 32 points against the Milwaukee Bucks on March 29, Thomas became only the sixth Celtic ever to score 2,000 points in a single season. He also extended his streak with at least one three-pointer to a franchise-best 50 straight games.

Thomas led the Celtics to a first-round win over the Chicago Bulls after learning the day before the series began that his younger sister, Chyna Thomas, had died in a car accident outside of his native Tacoma, Washington. After the Celtics defeated the Bulls 4–2, he flew cross-country to attend her funeral. He returned to Boston for Game 1 of the Eastern Conference semi-finals and had 33 points and nine assists in helping the Celtics defeat the Washington Wizards 123–111. In Game 2 against Washington, Thomas scored 53 points—the second-highest total in Celtics playoff history—to help Boston win 129–119 in overtime and take a 2–0 lead in the series. He became only the fifth Celtic to score 50 or more points in a postseason game, missing John Havlicek's team record by one point. In Game 7 against Washington, Thomas scored 29 points and had 12 assists to help the Celtics advance to the Eastern Conference Finals for the first time since 2012 with a 115–105 win and a 4–3 series victory. After the Celtics lost the first two games of the Conference Finals to the Cleveland Cavaliers, Thomas was ruled out for the remainder of the postseason with a hip injury.

Cleveland Cavaliers (2017–2018)
On August 22, 2017, Thomas was traded, along with Jae Crowder, Ante Žižić, and the Brooklyn Nets' unprotected 2018 first-round draft pick, to the Cleveland Cavaliers in exchange for Kyrie Irving. However, during the post-trade physical examination by Cleveland staff, concerns were raised about the health of Thomas's previously injured hip. As a result, eight days after the deal was announced, the Celtics agreed to send the Cavaliers a 2020 second-round draft pick via the Miami Heat to complete the trade. It was later reported that Thomas had been playing with a number of secondary issues in his hip, such as a loss of cartilage and some arthritis, for several seasons. On September 25, 2017, the Cavaliers said that Thomas might play by the end of the year. On December 21, 2017, Thomas scrimmaged with the Canton Charge of the NBA G League and dressed for the first time since joining the Cavaliers, suiting up but not playing against the Chicago Bulls. On January 2, 2018, Thomas made his long-awaited debut for the Cavaliers, scoring 17 points in 19 minutes off the bench in a 127–110 win over the Portland Trail Blazers. A day later, Thomas returned to TD Garden. Although he did not play in the Cavaliers' 102–88 loss to the Celtics, Thomas received a standing ovation from the Celtics' fans. On January 6, he had 19 points and four assists in his second appearance and first start of the season in a 131–127 win over the Orlando Magic. On January 20, he scored a season-high 24 points in a 148–124 loss to the Oklahoma City Thunder.

Los Angeles Lakers (2018)
On February 8, 2018, the Cavaliers traded Thomas, Channing Frye and a 2018 first-round draft pick to the Los Angeles Lakers in exchange for Jordan Clarkson and Larry Nance Jr. In his debut for the Lakers two days later, Thomas scored 22 points off the bench in a 130–123 loss to the Dallas Mavericks. On March 1, he scored a season-high 29 points in a 131–113 win over the Miami Heat. On March 29, he was ruled out for the rest of the season after undergoing arthroscopic surgery to his right hip.

Denver Nuggets (2018–2019)
On July 16, 2018, Thomas signed a one-year deal with the Denver Nuggets. He made his debut for the Nuggets on February 13, 2019, scoring all eight of his points in the third quarter of Denver's 120–118 win over the Sacramento Kings. It was his first game since March 22, 2018, when he was with the Lakers.

Washington Wizards (2019–2020)
On July 10, 2019, Thomas signed with the Washington Wizards. On December 22, Thomas was suspended for two games without pay for entering the stands during a game.

On February 6, 2020, Thomas was traded to the Los Angeles Clippers as a trade deadline acquisition. He was waived one day later.

New Orleans Pelicans (2021)
On April 3, 2021, Thomas signed a 10-day contract with the New Orleans Pelicans. In three games, he averaged 7.7 points.

Grand Rapids Gold (2021)
On December 13, 2021, Thomas signed with the Grand Rapids Gold of the NBA G League. He made his debut for the team on December 15, scoring 42 points, eight assists, and six rebounds in 42 minutes during a 127–131 loss to the Fort Wayne Mad Ants.

Return to the Lakers (2021)
On December 17, 2021, Thomas signed a 10-day contract with the Los Angeles Lakers to return to the franchise for a second time after the team was granted a hardship exception. In his season debut, he scored 19 points in 22 minutes in a loss against the Minnesota Timberwolves.

Dallas Mavericks (2021–2022)
On December 29, 2021, Thomas signed a 10-day contract with the Dallas Mavericks.

Return to Grand Rapids (2022)
On February 14, 2022, Thomas was re-acquired by the Grand Rapids Gold.

Charlotte Hornets (2022)
On March 3, 2022, Thomas signed a 10-day contract with the Charlotte Hornets. On March 12, he signed a second 10-day contract. On March 22, Thomas was signed for the remainder of the season.

National team career
In April 2018, Thomas was selected to the 35-player 2018–20 USA men's national team roster and attended the team's Las Vegas minicamp in July 2018. In February 2021, he was selected to the 14-player roster for the final round of the 2022 FIBA AmeriCup qualifiers. On February 19, in his first competitive game in over a year, Thomas scored 19 points in a 93–77 victory over Bahamas. He followed it up the day after by scoring 9 points, all in the first quarter, in a 96–75 victory against Mexico.

In November 2021, Thomas, along with Justin Anderson, joined the USA men's basketball roster for the 2023 FIBA Basketball World Cup. Both of the players were injury replacements for Frank Mason III and DaQuan Jeffries.

Career statistics

NBA

Regular season

|-
| style="text-align:left;"|
| style="text-align:left;"|Sacramento
| 65 || 37 || 25.5 || .448 || .379 || .832 || 2.6 || 4.1 || .8 || .1 || 11.5
|-
| style="text-align:left;"|
| style="text-align:left;"|Sacramento
| 79 || 62 || 26.9 || .440 || .358 || .882 || 2.0 || 4.0 || .8 || .0 || 13.9
|-
| style="text-align:left;"|
| style="text-align:left;"|Sacramento
| 72 || 54 || 34.7 || .453 || .349 || .850 || 2.9 || 6.3 || 1.3 || .1 || 20.3
|-
| style="text-align:left;"|
| style="text-align:left;"|Phoenix
| 46 || 1 || 25.7 || .426 || .391 || .872 || 2.4 || 3.7 || 1.0 || .1 || 15.2
|-
| style="text-align:left;"|
| style="text-align:left;"|Boston
| 21 || 0 || 26.0 || .411 || .345 || .861 || 2.1 || 5.4 || .6 || .0 || 19.0
|-
| style="text-align:left;"|
| style="text-align:left;"|Boston
| style="background:#cfecec;"|  82* || 79 || 32.2 || .428 || .359 || .871 || 3.0 || 6.2 || 1.1 || .1 || 22.2
|-
| style="text-align:left;"|
| style="text-align:left;"|Boston
| 76 || 76 || 33.8 || .463 || .379 || .909 || 2.7 || 5.9 || .9 || .2 || 28.9 
|-
| style="text-align:left;"|
| style="text-align:left;"|Cleveland
| 15 || 14 || 27.1 || .361 || .253 || .868 || 2.1 || 4.5 || .6 || .1 || 14.7
|-
| style="text-align:left;"|
| style="text-align:left;"|L.A. Lakers
| 17 || 1 || 26.8 || .383 || .327 || .921 || 2.1 || 5.0 || .4 || .1 || 15.6
|-
| style="text-align:left;"|
| style="text-align:left;"|Denver
| 12 || 0 || 15.1 || .343 || .279 || .630 || 1.1 || 1.9 || .4 || .1 || 8.1
|-
| style="text-align:left;"|
| style="text-align:left;"|Washington
| 40 || 37 || 23.1 || .403 || .413 || .816 || 1.7 || 3.7 || .3 || .2 || 12.2
|-
| style="text-align:left;"|
| style="text-align:left;"|New Orleans
| 3 || 0 || 16.0 || .333 || .250 || 1.000 || 1.3 || 1.7 || .3 || .0 || 7.7
|-
| style="text-align:left;"|
| style="text-align:left;"|L.A. Lakers
| 4 || 1 || 25.3 || .308 || .227 || .727 || 2.0 || 1.5 || .0 || .5 || 9.3
|-
| style="text-align:left;"|
| style="text-align:left;"|Dallas
| 1 || 0 || 13.0 || .375 || .000 || – || .0 || 4.0 || .0 || .0 || 6.0
|-
| style="text-align:left;"|
| style="text-align:left;"|Charlotte
| 17 || 0 || 12.9 || .433 || .397 || .933 || 1.2 || 1.4 || .4 || .2 || 8.3
|- class="sortbottom"
| style="text-align:center;" colspan="2"|Career
| 550 || 362 || 28.3 || .434 || .362 || .872 || 2.4 || 4.8 || .9 || .1 || 17.7
|- class="sortbottom"
| style="text-align:center;" colspan="2"|All-Star
| 2 || 0 || 19.0 || .423 || .333 || 1.000 || 2.0 || 2.0 || .5 || 0 || 14.5

Playoffs

|-
| style="text-align:left;"|2015
| style="text-align:left;"|Boston
| 4 || 0 || 29.8 || .333 || .167 || .969 || 3.0 || 7.0 || .8 || .0 || 17.5
|-
| style="text-align:left;"|2016
| style="text-align:left;"|Boston
| 6 || 6 || 36.7 || .395 || .283 || .809 || 3.0 || 5.0 || .7 || .8 || 24.2
|-
| style="text-align:left;"|2017
| style="text-align:left;"|Boston
| 15 || 15 || 34.7 || .425 || .333 || .820 || 3.1 || 6.7 || .9 || .1 || 23.3
|- class="sortbottom"
| style="text-align:center;" colspan="2"|Career
| 25 || 21 || 34.4 || .406 || .302 || .842 || 3.1 || 6.3 || .8 || .3 || 22.6

College

|-
| style="text-align:left;"|2008–09
| style="text-align:left;"|Washington
| 35 || 34 || 28.4 || .418 || .291 || .686 || 3.0 || 2.6 || 1.1 || .1 || 15.5
|-
| style="text-align:left;"|2009–10
| style="text-align:left;"|Washington
| 35 || 35 || 31.1 || .415 || .327 || .732 || 3.9 || 3.2 || 1.1 || .1 || 16.9
|-
| style="text-align:left;"|2010–11
| style="text-align:left;"|Washington
| 35 || 35 || 31.9 || .445 || .349 || .719 || 3.5 || 6.1 || 1.3 || .1 || 16.8
|- class="sortbottom"
| style="text-align:center;" colspan="2"|Career
| 105 || 104 || 30.5 || .426 || .322 || .736 || 3.5 || 4.0 || 1.2 || .1 || 16.4

Personal life
Thomas's sister, Chyna, died in a one-car accident on Interstate 5 in Federal Way, Washington, on April 15, 2017.

Thomas and his wife Kayla have two sons and one daughter together.

See also

 List of shortest players in National Basketball Association history

References

External links

Team USA profile

1989 births
Living people
20th-century African-American people
21st-century African-American sportspeople
African-American basketball players
American men's basketball players
Basketball players from Tacoma, Washington
Boston Celtics players
Charlotte Hornets players
Cleveland Cavaliers players
Dallas Mavericks players
Denver Nuggets players
Grand Rapids Gold players
Los Angeles Lakers players
National Basketball Association All-Stars
New Orleans Pelicans players
People from University Place, Washington
Phoenix Suns players
Point guards
Sacramento Kings draft picks
Sacramento Kings players
South Kent School alumni
United States men's national basketball team players
Washington Huskies men's basketball players
Washington Wizards players